The Perfect Mother is a 1997 American made-for-television drama film starring Tyne Daly, Ione Skye, Louis Ferreira, Tuesday Knight and David Cubitt. It was directed by Peter Levin and was first aired on CBS on February 18, 1997. The film is based on the true murder of Alexandra Ignatovic.

Plot
John Podaras, son of widow Eleni Podaras, marries a woman named Kathryn.  When Kathryn starts to question his mother's influence over her son, a legal battle ensues, culminating in tragedy.

Cast
 Tyne Daly as Elanie Podaras
 Ione Skye as Kathryn M. Podaras
 Louis Ferreira as John Podaras
 Tuesday Knight as Charlene Podaras
 David Cubitt as Dan Podaras

References

External links
 
 The Perfect Mother at Moviefone

1997 television films
1997 films
1997 drama films
American drama films
CBS network films
Films scored by Mark Snow
1990s English-language films
Films directed by Peter Levin
1990s American films